Happy Mistake is the third studio album by Italian singer and pianist Raphael Gualazzi. It was released in Italy through Sugar Music on the 14 February 2013. The album reached number 5 on the Italian Albums Chart. The album also charted in Belgium and France. An International Deluxe Edition was released on 25 March 2013.

Singles
"Sai (ci basta un sogno)" was released as the lead single from the album on 13 February 2013. The song peaked to number 15 on the Italian Singles Chart. "Senza ritegno" was released as the second single from the album on 13 February 2013.

Track listing

Standard listing

Charts

Weekly charts

Release history

References

2013 albums
Raphael Gualazzi albums